Jared G. Solomon (born November 18, 1978) is the representative for the 202nd District of the Pennsylvania House of Representatives. He is a member of the Democratic Party.

Political career
Following a defeat in the 2014 Democratic Primary against incumbent Mark B. Cohen, Solomon subsequently defeated Cohen in the 2016 Democratic Primary and then ran unopposed in the election for the 202nd District seat in the Pennsylvania House of Representatives. He served on the Aging & Older Adult Services, Children & Youth, Education, State Government and Tourism & Recreational Development committees.

Electoral history

2014

2016

References

Democratic Party members of the Pennsylvania House of Representatives
21st-century American politicians
Politicians from Philadelphia
1978 births
Living people